Rod Whitaker is an Australian former professional rugby league footballer. He was part of the inaugural Newcastle Knights squad in 1988.

Background
Whitaker played in the local leagues with Cessnock before signing with Newcastle in 1988.

Playing career
Whitaker made his first grade debut for Newcastle in Round 1 1988 against the Parramatta Eels in the club's inaugural match.  Whitaker played four more games for Newcastle.  His last match in first grade was a 14-8 loss against the Penrith Panthers.

References

External links
http://www.rugbyleagueproject.org/players/Rod_Whitaker/summary.html

Australian rugby league players
Newcastle Knights players
Living people
1963 births
Rugby league wingers
Place of birth missing (living people)